A. K. S. M. Shahidul Islam is a Jatiya Party (Ershad) politician and the former Member of Parliament of Chandpur-1.

Career
Islam was elected to parliament from Chandpur-1 as a Jatiya Party candidate in 1988.

References

Jatiya Party politicians
Living people
4th Jatiya Sangsad members
Year of birth missing (living people)